Shrikrishna Gopalrao Dani is a professor of mathematics at the Centre for Excellence in Basic Sciences, Mumbai who works in the broad area of ergodic theory.

Education
He did a master's degree from the University of Mumbai in 1969. He then joined the Tata Institute of Fundamental Research (TIFR), Mumbai for a PhD which he was awarded in 1975. After that, he joined TIFR as a faculty member. After TIFR, he was the Chair Professor at the Indian Institute of Technology, Bombay. He was a visiting scholar at the Institute for Advanced Study during 1976-77 and 1983–84.

Administration
He has been a member of the NBHM since 1996 and was the Chairman of the NBHM. He is also the chairman, Commission for Development and Exchange (CDE) of International Mathematical Union, for the period 2007‐10. 
He has served as Editor of Proceedings (Math. Sci.) of the Indian Academy of Sciences, Bangalore for many years since 1987.

Awards and recognition
Dani was awarded the Shanti Swarup Bhatnagar Prize in 1990. He gave an invited talk at the International Congress of Mathematicians held in Zurich, Switzerland in 1994. He received the World Academy of Sciences prize in 2007.

See also
 List of Indian mathematicians

References

External links
 

20th-century Indian mathematicians
Living people
1947 births
Fellows of the Indian National Science Academy
Fellows of The National Academy of Sciences, India
Institute for Advanced Study visiting scholars
Tata Institute of Fundamental Research alumni
Fellows of the Indian Academy of Sciences
People from Belgaum
Scientists from Karnataka
Ergodic theory
TWAS laureates
Recipients of the Shanti Swarup Bhatnagar Award in Mathematical Science